Quadray coordinates, also known as caltrop, tetray or Chakovian coordinates, were developed by Darrel Jarmusch and others, as another take on simplicial coordinates, a coordinate system using a simplex or tetrahedron as its basis polyhedron.

Geometric definition

The four basis (but not necessarily unit) vectors stem from the center of a regular tetrahedron and go to its four corners.  Their coordinate addresses are (1, 0, 0, 0), (0, 1, 0, 0), (0, 0, 1, 0) and (0, 0, 0, 1) respectively.  These may be positively scaled without rotation (e.g. negation) and linearly combined to span conventional XYZ space, with at least one of the four coordinates unneeded (set to zero).

Pedagogical significance

A typical application might set the edges of the basis tetrahedron as unit.  The tetrahedron itself may also be defined as the unit of volume (see below).

The four quadrays may be linearly combined to provide integer coordinates for the inverse tetrahedron (0,1,1,1), (1,0,1,1), (1,1,0,1), (1,1,1,0), and for the cube, octahedron, rhombic dodecahedron and cuboctahedron of volumes 3, 4, 6 and 20 respectively, given the starting tetrahedron of unit volume.

For example, given A, B, C, D as (1,0,0,0), (0,1,0,0), (0,0,1,0) and (0,0,0,1) respectively, the vertices of an octahedron with the same edge length and volume four would be A + B, A + C, A + D, B + C, B + D, C + D or all eight permutations of {1,1,0,0}.  

The 12 permutations of {2,1,1,0} define the vertices of the volume 20 cuboctahedron centered at (0,0,0,0).  These vectors point from any given sphere to its 12 surrounding neighbors in the cubic close packing (CCP), equivalently the IVM (isotropic vector matrix) in Synergetics. Therefore CCP ball centers all have non-negative integer coordinates.

If one now calls this volume "4D" as in "four-dimensional" or "four-directional" we have primed the pump for an understanding of R. Buckminster Fuller's "4D geometry," or Synergetics. 

In this American transcendentalist philosophy, the regular tetrahedron of edges one, as defined by four intertangent uni-radius balls, is taken as unit of volume. 

A set of familiar convex polyhedra, termed "the concentric hierarchy" is nested around it, per the above table, such that the cube has volume 3, the octahedron volume 4, rhombic dodecahedron volume 6, and cuboctahedron volume 20.

See also
Barycentric coordinates (mathematics)
Caltrop
Synergetics coordinates
Synergetics
Trilinear coordinates
Tetrahedron

References

External links
 Ace, Tom. Quadray formulas
 Ace, Tom. 4D-Quadray correspondence
 Urner, Kirby. The Quadray Papers (Math Forum)
 Urner, Kirby. Generating the Face Centered Cubic lattice (FCC) on Github

Coordinate systems